Susanne Julia Gervay  is an Australian author. Her younger fiction in the I Am Jack series are rites-of-passage books focusing on school bullying reaching adults and children. The first instalment has been adapted into a play by the award-winning Monkey Baa Theatre for Young People. I Am Jack is the first of four books including Super Jack, Always Jack and Being Jack. Her powerful realistic young adult literature includes Butterflies, The Cave and That's Why I Wrote This Song which is a collaborative work with her teenage daughter Tory who wrote and sings the songs that are part of the book and downloadable from her website.

Gervay is widely published in literary journals and anthologies. She is included in an anthology together with Sir Salman Rushdie, David Malouf, Thomas Keneally, entitled Fear Factor Terror Incognito, edited by Meenakshi Bharat and Sharon Rundle.

Gervay is head of the Society of Children's Book Writers and Illustrators (SCBWI) Australia East and New Zealand, former chair of the board of the New South Wales Writers' Centre, writer and ambassador of Room to Read, role model for Books in Homes, and patron of MonkeyBaa Theatre.  She has been a speaker in many festivals and conferences including the SCBWI International Conference at the Bologna Book Fair, Byron Bay Writers Festival, Beijing Literature Festival, Somerset celebration of Literature Festival and festivals and conferences from Delhi to New York.

Her work has appeared in literary journals including, Southerly, Mattoid, Westerly, Quadrant, Voices (National Library ACT), and many others.

Biography
A second generation daughter of post World War II Hungarian refugees, Gervay was born in Sydney. She attended Daceyville Public School and SCEGGS Darlinghurst.

Gervay went to University of Sydney and became a teacher. She graduated with a Master of Education from the University of New South Wales and a Master of Arts from the University of Technology, Sydney. Gervay founded The Hughenden Boutique Hotel, a literary and arts hotel in Woollahra, Sydney. She went on to become a children's author, where she has had great success.

She had two children James and Victoria (aka Tory) who are the inspiration for much of her writing. 

Gervay is a recognised Australian author of children's and young adult literature. She was awarded the Lady Cutler Award for Distinguished Services to Children's Literature in 2007, UTS Award for Excellence and an Order of Australia Medal in 2011. Her books are endorsed by organisations including The Children's Hospital at Westmead in Sydney, Room to Read, Life Education Australia, The Alannah and Madeline Foundation, Variety Children's Charity, Cancer Council Australia, Courage to Care and many others.

Bullying at school
As a specialist in child growth and development and author, Gervay was inspired by a son's experience of school bullying, to write I Am Jack. It has become an Australian best-seller and has been translated into other languages including Vietnamese, Bahasa and Korean. I Am Jack has been adapted by Money Baa Theatre Company, into a play that has toured Australia and the USA. It is now published in the US by Tricycle, an imprint of Kane Miller USA.

Youth disability
Gervay researched burns extensively working with the Children's Hospital at Westmead to write Butterflies which is a best selling Australian YA title, awarded Outstanding Youth Literature on Disability by the International Board on Books for Young People (IBBY). Gervay addressed the World Burn Conference in New York in August 2009 on Butterflies.

'I am Jack' the stage play
I am Jack series has been adapted into an acclaimed play by MonkeyBaa Theatre, which has toured nationally in Australia since 2008 and toured the US in 2014.

Published works

Books
 I Am Jack
 Super Jack
 Always Jack
 Being Jack
 Jamie's A Hero
Victoria's a Star
 Shadows of Olive Trees
Next Stop the Moon
 Butterflies
 The Cave
 That's Why I Wrote This Song
 Daisy Sunshine
 Gracie and Josh
 Ships in the Field
 Elephants Have Wings
 Heroes of the Secret Underground

Awards
 Winner, Crystal Kite Award for Heroes of the Secret Underground 2022
 Always Jack winner of Australian Family Therapists Award
 Lady Cutler Award for Services to Children's Literature 2007
 UTS Professional Achievement Award, Writing 2008
 The Cave The Biennial Book Award for YA Literature, Society of Women Writers 2003
 Super Jack The Biennial Book Award for Children's Literature, Society of Women Writers 2005
 I Am Jack Notable Award CBC, short listed for WA Young Reader Award, Family Therapy Awards and Children's Literature Prize for Peace and WAYBRA Award, runner up San Francisco Book Festival Award Children's Category 2009
 Butterflies Short listed for Children's Literature Prize for Peace; Family Therapists Award for Children's, WAYBRA Award, Outstanding Youth Literature on Disability (IBBY), Winner of New York Book Festival Award 2009
 That's Why I Wrote This Song shortlisted for WAYBRA Awards, winner of San Francisco Book Festival Award, Young Adult Category 2009
 National Society of Women Writers Short Story Award 1999
 Australian National University short story award 1996
 Finalist in AWG/Film Commission Mentorship Scheme 1995

References

Sources
 National Safe Schools Framework The Alannah and Madeline Foundation
 Life Education Australia Healthstar Information
 Somerset Celebration of Literature Festival 2009
 Beijing Literature Festival 2009
 Byron Bay Writers Festival 2008

External links
 Official website
 Susanne Gervay's blog

1950s births
Living people
Australian children's writers
Australian non-fiction writers
University of New South Wales alumni
Australian people of Hungarian descent
Australian women children's writers
People educated at Sydney Church of England Girls Grammar School
Recipients of the Medal of the Order of Australia